Kinyongia asheorum, also known commonly as the Mount Nyiro bearded chameleon, is a species of lizard in the family Chamaeleonidae. The species is endemic to Kenya. Only four specimens are known.

Etymology
The specific name, asheorum (Latin, genitive, plural), is in honor of British-Kenyan herpetologist James Ashe (1925–2004), and his wife Sanda (1944–2018).

Description
It has a distinct head casque, a pointed snout, and two horns on the tip of the snout. It is uniformly dark green with several white spots and brownish ridges.

Distribution and habitat
It inhabits large trees with extensive canopy cover.

Conservation
While the species K. asheorum appears not to be under direct threat, it has a very restricted distribution and may be impacted by logging, forest fires, and grazing outside the forest. It has been classified as Near Threatened by the IUCN.

References

Further reading
Spawls S, Howell K, Hinkel H, Menegon M (2018). Field Guide to East African Reptiles, Second Edition. London: Bloomsbury Natural History. 624 pp. . (Kinyongia asheorum, p. 265).

External links

Kinyongia
Reptiles described in 2009
Reptiles of Kenya
Endemic fauna of Kenya